Ronald Peter Straus (February 15, 1923 – August 6, 2012) was an American media proprietor. He was the president of WMCA, a radio station in New York City, and the chairman of Straus News, a publisher of newspapers in New York, New Jersey and Pennsylvania. He was the director of Voice of America from 1977 to 1979.

Early life
Ronald Peter Straus was born on February 15, 1923, in Manhattan, New York City. His father, Nathan Straus Jr., was a state senator and the owner of WMCA, a radio station in New York City. His mother was Helen Sachs, daughter of Bernard Sachs, a noted neurologist for which Tay–Sachs disease is named.  His grandfather, Nathan Straus, was the owner of Macy's.

Straus graduated from Yale University in 1944, and served in the United States Air Force in Germany during World War II.

Career
Straus began his career by working in public relations for Edward Bernays. He worked for the International Labor Office in Geneva, Switzerland from 1950 to 1955, and he was the head of its Washington office from 1955 to 1958.

Straus was appointed as the president of WMCA, the radio station owned by his family, in 1959. According to The New York Times, Straus "turned it into one of the nation's most innovative radio stations, broadcasting what are regarded as the first radio editorials and political endorsements and helping to popularize rock 'n' roll." When the Strauses sold WMCA in 1986, they purchased "several weekly newspapers in New York, New Jersey and Pennsylvania", and Strauss became the chairman of Straus News.

Straus was a delegate from New York to the 1960 and 1964 Democratic National Conventions, and "a longtime supporter of the Democratic Party." He was the director of African affairs at the United States Agency for International Development (USAID) from 1967 to 1969, and the director of Voice of America from 1977 to 1979. He was the author of three books.

Personal life and death
Straus married Ellen Louise Sulzberger, the niece of Arthur Hays Sulzberger and cousin of Arthur Ochs Sulzberger, publishers of The New York Times. They had four children: Diane Straus Tucker; Katherine Straus Caple (married to Blair Charles Caple); Jeanne Straus Tofel (divorced from Richard Tofel); and Eric Straus (married to Elisabeth Natalie Sand). Ellen died in 1995. In 1998, he remarried to Marcia Lewis, the mother of Monica Lewinsky.

Straus died on August 6, 2012, in Manhattan, at 89.

References

1923 births
2012 deaths
People from Manhattan
Yale University alumni
United States Army Air Forces personnel of World War II
New York (state) Democrats
American people of German-Jewish descent
American newspaper executives
American radio executives
Sulzberger family
Straus family
Riverdale Country School alumni
Loomis Chaffee School alumni